Los Amsterdam is the second studio album by Dutch electronic music ensemble Yellow Claw. The album features collaborations with The Galaxy, DJ Snake, Moksi, Cesqeaux and  GTA.

Track listing

Chart history

References

2017 albums
Yellow Claw (DJs) albums